These are some words which are unique to the Dorset dialect, spoken in Dorset in the West Country of England.

See also

 Dorset dialect

Citations

References

 
 

Dorset
Dialect
Dorset Dialect
Wikipedia glossaries using tables